Ceroplesis fasciata is a species of beetle in the family Cerambycidae. It was described by Per Olof Christopher Aurivillius in 1913 and is known from the Democratic Republic of the Congo.

References

fasciata
Beetles described in 1913
Endemic fauna of the Democratic Republic of the Congo